Samuel P. Walsh (January 30, 1902 – June 16, 1961) was an American educator and politician.

Born in the town of Oconto, Wisconsin, Walsh taught school. He served in the Wisconsin State Assembly as a Republican in 1925. His son was the sports announcer Blaine Walsh. Samuel Walsh died on June 16, 1961.

Notes

External links

1902 births
1961 deaths
People from Oconto, Wisconsin
Educators from Wisconsin
Republican Party members of the Wisconsin State Assembly
20th-century American politicians